Senator Gentile may refer to:

Lou Gentile (born 1979), Ohio State Senate
Vincent J. Gentile (born 1959), New York State Senate